Here follows a list of episodes from the Discovery Channel crime documentary The FBI Files, which premiered on October 20, 1998 and ended on March 24, 2006.

Series overview
{| class="wikitable"
|-
! colspan="2"|Season
! Episodes
! Season Premiere
! Season Finale
! DVD Release
|-
|bgcolor=#FFBF00 height="5px"|
|align="center"|[[List of The FBI Files episodes#Season 1 (1998–1999)|1]]
|align="center"| 13
|align="center"| October 20, 1998
|align="center"| February 23, 1999
|align="center"| January 6, 2009
|-
|bgcolor=#689CCF height="5px"|
|align="center"|[[List of The FBI Files episodes#Season 2 (1999–2000)|2]]
|align="center"| 18
|align="center"| September 28, 1999
|align="center"| May 30, 2000
|align="center"| April 21, 2009
|-
|bgcolor=#006600 height="5px"|
|align="center"|[[List of The FBI Files episodes#Season 3 (2000–2001)|3]]
|align="center"| 18
|align="center"| September 12, 2000
|align="center"| September 18, 2001
|align="center"| June 19, 2009
|-
|bgcolor=#00008B height="5px"|
|align="center"|[[List of The FBI Files episodes#Season 4 (2001–2002)|4]]
|align="center"| 18
|align="center"| October 2, 2001
|align="center"| May 2002
|align="center"| September 15, 2009
|-
|-
|bgcolor="#3198FF" height="10px"|
|align="center"|[[List of The FBI Files episodes#Season 5 (2002–2003)|5]]
|align="center"| 18
|align="center"| October 15, 2002
|align="center"| May 27, 2003
|align="center"| February 6, 2015
|-
|bgcolor="#66CC20" height="10px"|
|align="center"|[[List of The FBI Files episodes#Season 6 (2003–2004)|6]]
|align="center"| 20
|align="center"| September 20, 2003
|align="center"| May 7, 2004
|align="center"| February 6, 2015
|-
|bgcolor="#BCC9D2" height="10px"|
|align="center"|[[List of The FBI Files episodes#Season 7 (2004–2006)|7]]
|align="center"| 18
|align="center"| December 8, 2004
|align="center"| March 24, 2006
|align="center"| January 29, 2015
|}

Episodes

Season 1 (1998–1999)

Season 2 (1999–2000)

Season 3 (2000–2001)

Season 4 (2001–2002)

Season 5 (2002–2003)

Season 6 (2003–2004)

Season 7 (2004–2006)

External links
List of episodes

Lists of American non-fiction television series episodes
Federal Bureau of Investigation